Michael Jamel Neal (born June 26, 1987) is a former American football outside linebacker who played for the Green Bay Packers of the National Football League (NFL). He played college football at Purdue. Neal was drafted by the Green Bay Packers in the second round of the 2010 NFL Draft. With Green Bay, he won Super Bowl XLV in Arlington, Texas over the Pittsburgh Steelers.

Early years
A native of Merrillville, Indiana, he attended Merrillville High School where he was first-team all-state as senior after totaling 59 tackles, including 24 for loss and 12 sacks, with 20 quarterback hurries, six pass breakups and one blocked kick. As a junior, had 49 tackles, including 14 for loss and four sacks, with three pass breakups and one fumble recovery.

Considered a three-star recruit by Rivals.com, he was rated as the 29th best strongside defensive end prospect of his class.

College career
Neal attended Purdue University from 2005 to 2009. After redshirting his 2005 freshman year, he appeared in nine games as a sophomore, he had nine tackles, including 1.0 for loss, and one pass breakup despite missing five games with turf toe injury. In 2007, he appeared in all 13 games, and recorded 22 tackles, including 3.5 for loss and 2.0 sacks, with one pass breakup. In 2008, he appeared in all 12 games, including 11 starts. He ranked second on team with 5.5 sacks and third with 10.0 tackles for loss, while adding 33 total tackles. As a redshirt senior, he started all 12 games, finishing third on the team in tackles for loss with 11.5 and second in sack with 5.0, while forcing one fumble.

Professional career

Neal was selected in the second round (56th overall) by the Green Bay Packers in the 2010 NFL Draft. Neal played two games during his rookie season in 2010, recording a sack, forced fumble 3 tackles. In 2011, he gained more playing time, seeing time in seven games. Neal played 11 games with 1 start, making 11 tackles with 4.5 sacks in 2012. On March 12, 2013, he re-signed with the Packers on a two-year deal. In 2013, Neal played all 16 games for the first time of his career, totalling 47 tackles, 5 sacks, an interception, and a forced fumble. He played all 16 games, recording 33 tackles with 4.5 sacks in 2014. In 2015, Neal played all 16 games for the third straight year, producing 36 tackles and 4 sacks. He had an impressive performance in the NFC wild card game against the Washington Redskins, where he sacked quarterback Kirk Cousins twice while also forcing a fumble.

Statistics
The following statistics were retrieved from NFL.com.

References

External links

 
 
 

1987 births
Living people
Players of American football from Gary, Indiana
People from Merrillville, Indiana
American football defensive tackles
American football defensive ends
American football linebackers
Purdue Boilermakers football players
Green Bay Packers players